Heaton Norris railway station was a railway station in Stockport, England, which opened in 1840 and closed in 1959.

Further reading

References

Disused railway stations in the Metropolitan Borough of Stockport
Former London and North Western Railway stations
Railway stations in Great Britain opened in 1840
Railway stations in Great Britain closed in 1959